is a Japanese composer and keyboardist. He is known for his numerous contributions in video games, including the Tales, Star Ocean, Mario Golf, Mario Tennis, Golden Sun, and Dark Souls series, as well as several other anime series, television dramas, and progressive rock albums.

Career
Sakuraba was born on August 5, 1965, in Akita Prefecture, Japan. While attending Meiji University, Sakuraba began to take music composition seriously and formed the progressive rock band "Clashed Ice" in 1984, consisting of him on keyboards and Genta Kudo on drums and vocals. After the duo had graduated the following year, they were noticed by music producer Shingo Ueno, and ending up signing with Made in Japan Records. The band had then added bassist Tetsuya Nagatsuma, and was renamed as "Deja Vu". In 1988, the band would release their only studio album, Baroque in the Future, composed entirely by Sakuraba. Although the band disbanded in 1989, Sakuraba would later go on to release a similar-sounding solo album, Gikyokuonsou, in 1991.

In late 1989, Sakuraba began working as a composer for Wolf Team, joining Masaaki Uno and Yasunori Shiono. The professional friendships formed here in Sakuraba's early years have resulted in a great demand for his composing and arranging abilities. In 1994, former Wolf Team director and composer Masaaki Uno started working at Camelot Software Planning as a coordinator and sound director, developing games for Sony, Sega and Nintendo. Sakuraba has been called upon as a composer for many Camelot games, including all of the games in the Mario Golf, Mario Tennis, and Golden Sun series.

In 1995, Wolf Team developed the breakthrough game Tales of Phantasia for Namco. This and other early games in the Tales series primarily featured Sakuraba and fellow Wolf Team co-worker Shinji Tamura as composers. Also in 1995, former Wolf Team director and producer Jun Asanuma, as well as Tales of Phantasia writer and programmer Yoshiharu Gotanda, founded tri-Ace with financial backing from Enix. The Star Ocean and Valkyrie Profile games have been their main franchises. Sakuraba has been the composer for nearly all of their games.

In 1999, long time Sakuraba sound designer and programmer Hiroya Hatsushiba, a former member of Wolf Team and tri-Ace, founded tri-Crescendo. While initially continuing to contribute sound work to tri-Ace games, tri-Crescendo began game development in 2001. Together with Monolith Soft, tri-Crescendo started working on Baten Kaitos: Eternal Wings and the Lost Ocean; Namco provided the financial backing. Hatsushiba, as director and main programmer of the project, again called upon Sakuraba's composing services. This has extended to the sequel, Baten Kaitos Origins, and Eternal Sonata. The remnants of Wolf Team later morphed into the Namco Telenet joint subsidiary Namco Tales Studio in 2003.

In 2007, Sakuraba was selected to join a long list of video game composers to arrange music for Super Smash Bros. Brawl. He chose to arrange the famous "Menu Theme" from the game's predecessor, Super Smash Bros. Melee. He also arranged "Gourmet Race" from Kirby Super Star, "Jungle Level Ver.2" from Donkey Kong Country, "Mario Tennis / Mario Golf" from Mario Tennis and Mario Golf, "Victory Road" from Pokémon Ruby and Sapphire, the "Airship Theme" from Super Mario Bros. 3, the "Battlefield Theme", "Final Destination", and "Battle Scene / Final Boss (Golden Sun)" from Golden Sun: The Lost Age.

In more recent years, Sakuraba has continued to write music for games in franchises he has worked with before, including Star Ocean: The Last Hope, Golden Sun: Dark Dawn, Mario Tennis Open, Mario Golf: World Tour, and many Tales series games, including Hearts, Graces, Xillia, Xillia 2, Zestiria, and Berseria. He has also contributed to other well known games such as the Dark Souls series, Kid Icarus: Uprising, and Phantasy Star Nova. In 2014, he was selected to provide musical arrangements for Brawl's successor, Super Smash Bros. for Nintendo 3DS and Wii U. For this title, Sakuraba arranged "Theme from Area 6 / Missile Slipstream" from Star Fox 64 and Star Fox Command, "Battle! (Team Flare)" from Pokémon X and Y, and "The valedictory elegy" from Baten Kaitos Origins.

In addition, Sakuraba has continued to write for non-gaming and anime projects, including solo albums such as "Forest of glass", "What's up?", and "Passage", as well as lending his arrangement and performance abilities for many doujin styled arrange albums.

Live performances
During July 2003, Sakuraba held a live concert in Tokyo, Japan. He performed progressive rock interpretations of his music from games Star Ocean: Till the End of Time, Star Ocean: The Second Story, Star Ocean: Blue Sphere and Valkyrie Profile. His bandmates for this concert were bassist Atsushi Hasegawa (a member of the band Gerard) and drummer Toshihiko Nakamura. As noted, this concert was released on DVD and CD. At the same time as they were rehearsing for the concert, Hasegawa and Nakamura assisted in recording new material for the Director's Cut of Star Ocean: Till the End of Time.

The following year, the trio performed another concert. The venue was smaller, but included music from Baten Kaitos and a couple of new, non-game-related pieces. This concert was not officially recorded and released, however. However, in 2006, a new concert was given in celebration of tri-Ace's Valkyrie Profile: Silmeria.

In September 2011, Sakuraba and his band joined up with the Earthbound Papas in Kawasaki, led by former Final Fantasy series composer Nobuo Uematsu, to perform at Fantasy Rock Fest 2011. The event featured game music performances, along with new progressive rock pieces from both bands. The first six tracks that Sakuraba and his band played were sold at the event as a preview CD for his then-upcoming solo album After all..., which was released by Strange Days Records on October 19, 2011.

In June 2015, Sakuraba performed at the Tales of Festival at the Yokohama Arena, being the first time he performed tracks from the Tales series at a live event. A selection of Sakuraba's music from the Dark Souls and Tales series was performed live at the Salle Pleyel concert hall in Paris in February 2017. The event, known as "Orchestral Memories", featured a guest appearance by Sakuraba. The 2020 Tales of Festival featured an original song by him called "Endless Journey", dedicated to the 25th anniversary of the series.

Musical style
Sakuraba takes the baroque and melodic Japanese progressive rock of the 1980s and expands it with his own trademark complex rhythms, emotional flutes, use of male choir, and heavy reverb. The lighter side of his style is a crossover between symphonic progressive rock, cinematic orchestra and new age. Sakuraba is also known for introducing many jazz-like improvisations to his music style. In recent years, he has made efforts towards expanding his style even further, becoming an accomplished symphonist and a versatile arranger.

Works
All works listed below were solely composed by Sakuraba unless otherwise noted.

Video games

Anime/television/film

Arrangements/other

References

External links
 
Discography at VGMdb

1965 births
Anime composers
Japanese film score composers
Japanese male film score composers
Japanese rock keyboardists
Japanese rock musicians
Japanese television composers
Living people
Male television composers
Musicians from Akita Prefecture
Progressive rock musicians
Progressive rock keyboardists
Symphonic rock musicians
Tales (video game series) music
Video game composers